Collect 'Em All is the third studio album by Californian punk rock band, Tilt. It was released in March 1998 on Fat Wreck Chords.

Track listing 
All lyrics written by Cinder Block
"Hero Marauder" – 1:47    
"Palm Tree (In West Oakland)" – 1:51    
"Partial Birth" – 2:26    
"Old Skool Pig" – 1:24    
"Storm Center" – 1:24    
"Gun Play" – 1:48     
"Sterile Heaven" – 1:58     
"Dear Wife" – 3:25     
"Goddess of the Moon" – 2:29     
"Collect 'Em All" – 1:52     
"Tundra" – 1:49     
"Dental Wreck" – 1:30     
"Clothes Horse" – 1:42     
"Minister of Culture" – 1:47     
"Molly Coddled" – 1:59

Credits 
 Cinder Block – vocals
 Jeffrey Bischoff – guitar
 Jimi Cheetah – bass
 Vincent Camacho – drums
 Recorded in November 1997 at Motor Studios, San Francisco, California, US
 Produced by Ryan Greene and Tilt
 Engineered by Ryan Greene

References

External links 
Fat Wreck Chords album page

1998 albums
Tilt (band) albums
Fat Wreck Chords albums
Albums produced by Ryan Greene